John Murton (21 June 1942 – 24 October 2021) was an Australian rules footballer who played with Collingwood in the Victorian Football League (VFL).

Notes

External links 

Profile at Collingwood Forever

1942 births
2021 deaths
Australian rules footballers from Victoria (Australia)
Collingwood Football Club players
Warragul Football Club players